The 2004 Bank of the West Classic was a women's tennis tournament played on outdoor hard courts that was part of the Tier II Series of the 2004 WTA Tour. It was the 33rd edition of the tournament and took place at the Taube Tennis Center in Stanford, California, United States, from July 12 through July 18, 2004. Second-seeded Lindsay Davenport won the singles title, her third at the event after 1998 and 1999, and earned $ 93,000 first-prize money.

Finals

Singles

 Lindsay Davenport defeated.  Venus Williams, 7–6(7–4), 5–7, 7–6(7–4)

Doubles

 Eleni Daniilidou /  Nicole Pratt defeated  Iveta Benešová /  Claudine Schaul, 6–2, 6–4

External links
 ITF tournament edition details
 Tournament draws

Bank of the West Classic
Silicon Valley Classic
Bank of the West Classic
Bank of the West Classic
Bank of the West Classic